Hans Axel Müller Odriozola (born 2 October 1996) is a Uruguayan professional footballer who plays as a midfielder for Swiss Challenge League club Schaffhausen.

Career
Müller is a youth academy graduate of Nacional. He spent 2015–16 season on loan at youth team of Italian club Pescara, where he scored 15 goals from 28 matches. Following his impressive performance with youth team, Pescara senior team manager Massimo Oddo named him on bench for senior team's Serie B matches against Cesena and Spezia.

With no opportunities at Nacional, Müller was loaned out to Racing Montevideo and Montevideo Wanderers during 2018 and 2019 seasons respectively. While at Racing, he made his professional debut on 21 July 2018 in a 1–1 draw against Peñarol. He scored his first goal on 14 October 2018 in Racing's 2–1 win against Montevideo Wanderers.

Müller signed a two-year contract with Cerro Largo in January 2020. On 23 September 2020 it was reported, that Müller's contract had been terminated by mutual agreement.

After getting released by Cerro Largo, Müller started to train with Swiss Challenge League club Schaffhausen in October 2020. In January 2021, he signed a contract with the club until June 2022.

Personal life
Müller also holds a German passport. He is passionate about Paddle tennis and has represented his country in a youth tournament held in Morocco. He has a twin sister named Ingrid.

References

External links
 

1996 births
Living people
People from Tacuarembó
Uruguayan people of German descent
Association football midfielders
Uruguayan footballers
Uruguayan Primera División players
Swiss Challenge League players
Tacuarembó F.C. players
Club Nacional de Football players
Delfino Pescara 1936 players
Racing Club de Montevideo players
Montevideo Wanderers F.C. players
Cerro Largo F.C. players
FC Schaffhausen players
Uruguayan expatriate footballers
Uruguayan expatriate sportspeople in Italy
Uruguayan expatriate sportspeople in Switzerland
Expatriate footballers in Italy
Expatriate footballers in Switzerland